The 2018 CONCACAF Under-20 Championship was the 6th edition of the CONCACAF Under-20 Championship (27th edition if all eras included), the men's under-20 international football tournament organized by CONCACAF. It was hosted at Bradenton, Florida, United States between 1–21 November 2018.

A new format was announced, removing the regional Central American and Caribbean qualifiers and guaranteeing each entrant a minimum of four competitive games.

The competition would determine the four CONCACAF representatives at the 2019 FIFA U-20 World Cup in Poland, The United States, Mexico, Panama and Honduras qualified. It would also determine the CONCACAF teams playing at the 2019 Pan American Games men's football tournament in Lima, Peru.

The United States were the defending champions of the competition. They successfully defended their title as hosts, winning the final 2–0 against Mexico for their 2nd CONCACAF U-20 Championship title.

Teams
Unlike previous tournament, there was no qualification for this edition, and a total of 34 teams (out of 41 CONCACAF members) directly entered the final tournament. Among them are all three members of the North American Football Union (NAFU), all seven members of the Central American Football Union (UNCAF), and 24 (out of 31) members of the Caribbean Football Union (CFU).

Notes

Did not enter

 (withdrew)

Venues
Matches were at played at four stadiums in the IMG Academy:
IMG Academy Stadium
IMG Soccer Stadium
IMG Soccer Complex Field #2
IMG Soccer Complex Field #11

Draw
The draw for the final tournament was held on 13 September 2018, 10:00 EDT (UTC−4), at the CONCACAF Headquarters in Miami. Based on the CONCACAF Men's Under-20 Ranking, the top six ranked teams were seeded into position one of each group, while the remaining 28 teams were distributed in five pots as follows:

The 34 teams were drawn into six groups: four groups of six teams and two groups of five teams. The winners from each group in the group stage advance to the qualification stage, where the six teams are divided into two groups of three teams (winners of Groups A, C and E in one group, winners of Groups B, D and F in another group). The top two teams from each group in the qualification stage qualify for the 2019 FIFA U-20 World Cup, with the group winners also advancing to the final to decide the champions of the CONCACAF U-20 Championship.

Squads

Players born on or after 1 January 1999 are eligible to compete. Each team must submit a provisional 35-player roster (4 must be goalkeepers) and a final 20-player roster (2 must be goalkeepers). After the completion of the group stage, a team advancing to the qualification stage may replace up to six players with those from the provisional roster.

Group stage
The winners of each group in the group stage advance to the qualification stage. If the winners of a group is a non-FIFA member, the highest-ranked FIFA member in the group advances to the qualification stage (Regulations Article 12.9).

Tiebreakers (both group stage and qualification stage)
Teams are ranked according to points (3 points for a win, 1 point for a draw, 0 points for a loss). The rankings of teams in each group are determined as follows (regulations Articles 12.5 and 12.8):

If two or more teams are equal on the basis of the above three criteria, their rankings are determined as follows:

All times are local, EDT (UTC−4) up to 3 November, EST (UTC−5) starting 4 November.

Group A

Group B

Group C

Group D

Group E

Group F

Qualification stage
The top two teams of each group in the qualification stage qualify for the 2019 FIFA U-20 World Cup, with the winners of each group also advancing to the final to decide the champions of the CONCACAF U-20 Championship.

Group G

Group H

Final
In the final, if the match is level at the end of 90 minutes, extra time is played, and if still tied after extra time, the match is decided by a penalty shoot-out (Regulations Article 12.10).

Awards

Winners

Individual awards
The following awards were given at the conclusion of the tournament.

Goalscorers

Qualification for international tournaments

Qualified teams for FIFA U-20 World Cup
The following four teams from CONCACAF qualify for the 2019 FIFA U-20 World Cup.

1 Bold indicates champions for that year. Italic indicates hosts for that year.

Qualified teams for Pan American Games
The tournament was used to determine the four teams from CONCACAF which would qualify for the 2019 Pan American Games men's football tournament. The top team from each of the three zones, i.e., Caribbean (CFU), Central American (UNCAF), and North American (NAFU), would qualify, with the fourth team to be determined by CONCACAF at a later date. However, United States declined to participate, so Mexico qualified for the North American berth.

2 Bold indicates champions for that year. Italic indicates hosts for that year.

Controversy

Cuban defectors

Twelve of the Cuban players (Arturo Hector Godoy, Bruno Manuel Rendon Cardoso, Christopher Yoel Llorente Fernandez, Danny Echeverria Diaz
Frank Leidam Nodarse Chavez, Geobel Perez Oquendo, Josue Vega Alvarez, Juan Manuel Andreus Milanes, Omar Perez Ramirez
Omar Proenza Calderon, Rivaldo Ibarra Thompson, Rolando Aldahir Oviendo Valdez and Yandri Romero Clark.) opted to stay in United States following the team's exit from the competition.

Visa issues

Octavio Rodríguez, the assistant coach of the Guatemalan staff team and four players; Carlos Orellana (Guastatoya), Carlos Monterroso (Municipal), Nelso Iván García (Communications) and Luis Francisco Estrada (Siquinalá) were denied visas to participate in the tournament. A further seven players from Honduras were also denied visas.

Notes

References

External links
Under 20s – Men, CONCACAF.com

 
2018
U-20 Championship
2018 Concacaf U-20 Championship
2018 in youth association football
November 2018 sports events in the United States
Qualification tournaments for the 2019 Pan American Games
CONCACAF U-20 Championship
2019 FIFA U-20 World Cup qualification